Beijing University Students Gymnasium is an indoor arena located in 11 N 3rd Ring Road W, Haidian District, Beijing, China. It is affiliated to the Capital Institute of Physical Education in Beijing, China. The gymnasium has a floor space of 12,000 square metres and 4,200 seats. The gymnasium was built in 1988 and hosted the basketball events of the 1990 Asian Games. Currently the stadium is hosting the annual snooker event of China Open.

It is necessary to point out that the Chinese name of Beijing University Students' Gymnasium (北京大学生体育馆) is only one character away from Peking University Gymnasium (北京大学体育馆), which are so similar that easily cause confusion by foreigners.

References 

Buildings and structures in Beijing
Sports venues in Beijing
Venues of the 1990 Asian Games